Adhik Shirodkar was an Indian  lawyer and politician. A prominent criminal lawyer from Mumbai, Shirodkar represented the Shiv Sena party in the Srikrishna Commission. He was a member of the Rajya Sabha (upper house of the Parliament of India). Shirodkar died on 19 April 2014.

References 

Shiv Sena politicians
Rajya Sabha members from Maharashtra
2014 deaths
20th-century Indian lawyers
Year of birth missing
Politicians from Mumbai
Place of birth missing
Marathi politicians